Wheatland is a town in Kenosha County, Wisconsin, United States. The population was 3,391 at the 2020 census. The census-designated place of Powers Lake is located partially in the town. The unincorporated communities of Lily Lake, New Munster, and Slades Corners are also located in the town.

Settlement in the town is centered along 328th Avenue (Kenosha County Highway W) north of 60th Street (Kenosha County Highway K). The former Wisconsin Central Railway Chicago-Twin Cities main line (now the Canadian National Railway) also runs through the town; a passenger and freight station used was located here well into the 20th century.

Geography

History
The first settlers in Wheatland were Schuyler Bonday in August 1837 and Adolph Reitbrook in September 1837. Wheatland was formed on May 7, 1842. Its name is derived from the wheat which was said to grow well in the rich soil in the area. The first constable was James B. Powers, for whom Powers Lake is named.

When the Town of Wheatland was formed, it was originally in Racine County. On January 30, 1850, the town was transferred to Kenosha County, where it remains today.

Demographics

As of the census of 2000, there were 3,292 people, 1,209 households, and 893 families residing in the town. The racial makeup of the town was 98.12% White, 0.49% African American, 0.21% Native American, 0.24% Asian, 0.27% from other races, and 0.67% from two or more races. Hispanic or Latino of any race were 0.97% of the population.

There were 1,209 households, out of which 36.0% had children under the age of 18 living with them, 60.0% were married couples living together, 9.5% had a female householder with no husband present, and 26.1% were non-families. 20.7% of all households were made up of individuals, and 7.1% had someone living alone who was 65 years of age or older. The average household size was 2.72 and the average family size was 3.15.

In the town, the population was spread out, with 26.9% under the age of 18, 8.1% from 18 to 24, 30.3% from 25 to 44, 25.3% from 45 to 64, and 9.4% who were 65 years of age or older. The median age was 37 years. For every 100 females, there were 104.6 males. For every 100 females age 18 and over, there were 99.3 males.

The median income for a household in the town was $52,386, and the median income for a family was $61,797. Males had a median income of $43,000 versus $27,917 for females. The per capita income for the town was $21,299. About 3.5% of families and 5.3% of the population were below the poverty line, including 3.2% of those under age 18 and 5.9% of those age 65 or over.

January 2008 tornado
A tornado touched down in the town on January 7, 2008. The tornado was rated EF3 on the Enhanced Fujita Scale, with winds estimated at 140-150 mph. This left 160 people homeless or unable to return to their homes. The damage was estimated at $18 million.

References

The Racine Journal, Tuesday, December 23, 1902, Page 1: "THE BEGINNING OF KENOSHA COUNTY"

External links
 Town of Wheatland official website

Towns in Kenosha County, Wisconsin
Populated places in Kenosha County, Wisconsin
Towns in Wisconsin